The 2019 Puerto Vallarta Open was a professional tennis tournament played on hard courts. It was the second edition of the tournament which was part of the 2019 ATP Challenger Tour. It took place in Puerto Vallarta, Mexico between 29 April and 5 May 2019.

Singles main-draw entrants

Seeds

 1 Rankings are as of 22 April 2018.

Other entrants
The following players received wildcards into the singles main draw:
  Lucas Gómez
  Gerardo López Villaseñor
  Luis Patiño
  Peter Polansky
  Manuel Sánchez

The following player received entry into the singles main draw as an alternate:
  Alafia Ayeni

The following players received entry into the singles main draw using their ITF World Tennis Ranking:
  Andrés Artuñedo
  Baptiste Crepatte
  Skander Mansouri
  João Menezes
  Alejandro Tabilo

The following players received entry from the qualifying draw:
  Pavel Krainik
  Facundo Mena

Champions

Singles
 
 Sebastian Ofner def.  John-Patrick Smith 7–6(10–8), 3–6, 6–3.

Doubles

 Matt Reid /  John-Patrick Smith def.  Gonzalo Escobar /  Luis David Martínez 7–6(12–10), 6–3.

References

2019 ATP Challenger Tour
2019 in Mexican sports
April 2019 sports events in Mexico
May 2019 sports events in Mexico